Lawlor Events Center is northern Nevada's largest multi-purpose arena. It is located in Reno, Nevada at the intersection of North Virginia Street and 15th Street on the University of Nevada, Reno campus. It is named after former athletic director, baseball, basketball and football coach Jake Lawlor.

It was built in 1983 and has a capacity of 12,000 including 11,536 multi-purpose seats. Lawlor is home to the Nevada Wolf Pack basketball teams, and also hosts boxing, concerts, conferences, PBR events, rodeos, WWE and other entertainment events. It is also the host for Washoe County School District high school graduations and winter commencement ceremonies for the university.

History
Lawlor Events Center hosted the 1986 Big Sky Conference, 1996–2000 Big West Conference and 2005–2006 and 2009–2010 Western Athletic Conference men's basketball tournaments.

On Saturday, February 4, 1984 Duran Duran performed at Lawlor as part of their Sing Blue Silver world tour.

On Thursday, February 16, 1984 Genesis performed at Lawlor as part of their Mama Tour.

The music video for Eddie Money's 1986 single "Take Me Home Tonight" was filmed at the arena.

Bon Jovi played a sold-out show on January 23, 1987 during their Slippery When Wet Tour.

On April 21, 1990, Santana performed here as part of their Spirits Dancing in the Flesh Tour.

Tina Turner held her Twenty Four Seven Tour here on December 2, 2000.

On August 1, 2003, rock band Fleetwood Mac performed at Lawlor, as part of their Say You Will Tour.

See also
 List of NCAA Division I basketball arenas

References

External links
 Lawlor Events Center
 Lawlor Events Center – Home of Wolf Pack Basketball
 A Guide to the Lawlor Events Center Records, AC 0634. University Archives, University Libraries; University of Nevada, Reno.

1983 establishments in Nevada
College basketball venues in the United States
Basketball venues in Nevada
Boxing venues in Nevada
Sports venues completed in 1983
Sports venues in Reno, Nevada
Nevada Wolf Pack basketball venues
Nevada Wolf Pack sports venues